This is a list of public art in Charleston, South Carolina, in the United States. This list applies only to works of public art on permanent display in an outdoor public space. For example, this does not include artworks in museums. Public art may include sculptures, statues, monuments, memorials, murals, and mosaics.

Charleston, South Carolina
Charleston
Charleston
Public art